James Regan may refer to:

 James Regan (cricketer) (born 1994), English cricketer
 Jim Regan (rugby), Welsh rugby union and rugby league footballer 1930s
 James Regan (hurler) (born 1991), Irish hurler
 James Regan (politician) (1835–1927), Ontario farmer, merchant and politician
Jimmy Regan, character in Man's Woman, played by Edward Kimball